Jane Tompkins (born 1940) is an American literary scholar who has worked on canon formation, feminist literary criticism, and reader response criticism. She has also coined and developed the notion of cultural work in literary studies and contributed to the new historicist form of literary criticism that emerged in the 1980s. She earned her PhD at Yale in 1966 and subsequently taught at Temple University, Duke University, and the University of Illinois at Chicago. She is married to cultural critic Stanley Fish.

Cultural work
Tompkins developed her idea of texts doing cultural work in her 1985 book Sensational Designs: The Cultural Work of American Fiction, 1790-1870. She argues that texts (e.g. novels) do "a certain kind of cultural work within a specific historical situation." To her, "plots and characters" provide "society with a means of thinking about itself, defining certain aspects of a social reality which the authors and their readers shared, dramatizing its conflicts, and recommending solutions. It is the notion of literary texts as doing work, expressing and shaping the social context that produced them, that I wish to substitute finally for the critical perspective that sees them as attempts to achieve a timeless, universal ideal of truth and formal coherence."

Books
 Sensational Designs: The Cultural Work of American Fiction, 1790-1870. Oxford: Oxford University Press, 1985.
 West of Everything: The Inner Life of Westerns. Oxford: Oxford University Press, 1993.
 A Life In School: What The Teacher Learned. New York: Perseus Books, 1996.
 Reading Through The Night. University of Virginia Press, 2018.

References

1940 births
American academics of English literature
American literary critics
Women literary critics
Literary critics of English
Living people
American women critics